The W. H. Faling House is a historic house located at 606 Parker St. in Cambridge, Nebraska. The house was constructed in 1909 by Nebraska architect William F. Gernandt. The home's Neoclassical design features a full height porch with groups of banded columns and a wide front door with symmetrical lights on the sides; the home is considered the best representation of Neoclassical architecture in Cambridge. W. H. Faling, a local merchant and the first chairman of Cambridge, owned and occupied the house until his death in 1933. The house now functions as a bed and breakfast.

The W. H. Faling House was added to the National Register of Historic Places on November 22, 1999.

References

External links

Houses on the National Register of Historic Places in Nebraska
Neoclassical architecture in Nebraska
Houses completed in 1909
Houses in Furnas County, Nebraska
National Register of Historic Places in Furnas County, Nebraska
Cambridge, Nebraska